Coffee Crater is a well-preserved cinder cone south of Mount Edziza, British Columbia, Canada. It was formed during the Holocene period. It is within the Snowshoe lava field, part of the Mount Edziza volcanic complex.

See also
List of volcanoes in Canada
List of Northern Cordilleran volcanoes
Northern Cordilleran Volcanic Province
Mount Edziza
Volcanism of Canada
Volcanism of Western Canada

External links

Cinder cones of British Columbia
Mount Edziza volcanic complex
Holocene volcanoes
Monogenetic volcanoes
Two-thousanders of British Columbia